Alloprevotella rava is a Gram-negative and anaerobic bacterium from the genus of Alloprevotella which has been isolated from the human oral cavity.

Saliva samples of suicidal students are positively correlated with lower Alloprevotella rava levels.

References

Bacteria described in 2013